Marava pulchella is a species of little earwig in the family Spongiphoridae. It is found in the Caribbean and North America.

References

Further reading

 

Earwigs
Articles created by Qbugbot
Insects described in 1839